Fozzy Group is a group of companies that owns and manages retail stores in Ukraine. Based in Kyiv, it is Ukraine's largest supermarket company and food retail group. The company has had operations in Ukraine since 1997, and operates Silpo supermarkets, Fozzy C&C hypermarkets, convenience markets Fora, Bila Romashka pharmaceutical supermarkets, Le Silpo premium format stores, Ringoo electronics stores, and restaurants. Restaurants operated by the company are U Khromogo Pola, Staromak, U Golema, La Bodeguita del Medio, Divan.

As of August 2012, the company owns and operates 233 Silpo supermarket stores in Ukraine,  and markets its own private label brand of products under the name "Premiya." Additionally, Fozzy Group imports wines from various wine-producing regions and wineries into Ukraine.

At the end of March 2015, Fozzy Group launched an online-shop with delivery in Kyiv.

Industries
Fozzy Group operates the CJSC (Nizhynskyi canning) production facilities for the Nizhyn brand of canned fruit and vegetables. The company exports its canned food products internationally, including to North America, Eastern Europe and Asia. Additional industrial lines owned and operated by the company are a poultry farm named Varto Ltd., a meat-processing plant named Ruta LLC that produces manufactured meat and sausages, and a company named Eco-service Ukraine LLC involved in the commerce and servicing of portable toilets.

Premiya
The company markets products under its own private label brand named "Premiya". Some products under the Premia brand include certified organic sturgeon caviar, sandwiches and cream cheese. Another Premiya-brand product is fresh live herbs for cooking that are sold to the customer planted in pots.

Wine importing
Fozzy Group also imports wines into Ukraine from 34 wine producers (as of May 2011), including brands from Italy, Germany, Hungary, France, Italy, Chile, Argentina, New Zealand, and South Africa.

Legal issues
In February 2003, the Ukrainian Prosecutor General's Office announced that several cases involving tax evasion, counterfeit vodka and illegal equipment sales had been opened against Fozzy Group. Additionally, accusations were made by the Prosecutor General's Office that Fozzy Group engaged in illegal money laundering. At the time, Volodymyr Kostelman, President of the company, stated that the Prosecutor General's Office findings regarding tax evasion were based upon incorrect figures, and that Fozzy Group had not engaged in any illegal activities. It was also reported at the time that Kostelman "hinted that his company was framed by tax officials and that Ukrainian businesses are currently not safe from corruption."

Logistics 
The group of companies has its own logistics, which includes 4 centers in Ukraine: in Kyiv, Zaporizhzhia, Odesa and Kharkiv. The needs of the group are served by 562 trucks. The main fleet is located in the village. Trebukhiv, Brovary district, Kyiv region, where the main office and service station (2,500 m2) are also located.

In February 2018, the group of companies renewed its fleet by purchasing 40 Mercedes-Benz Actros trucks worth € 5.2 million. In July 2018, the company bought the Post.ua courier service, founded by Vitaliy Yanitsky. Based on it, Fozzy Group began to develop its own delivery operator B2C Justin.

See also

 List of supermarket chains in Ukraine

References

Further reading

External links
 Official website
 Official online-shop Fozzy

Supermarkets of Ukraine
Food and drink companies of Ukraine
Ukrainian companies established in 1997
Retail companies established in 1997